Harold Wolfe (November 24, 1888 – July 28, 1971), nicknamed "Whitey", was an American professional baseball player. He appeared in 10* games in Major League Baseball in 1917, seven for the Chicago Cubs and three for the Pittsburgh Pirates. He played two games at shortstop, one in left field, and one at second base, with the remainder of his appearances coming as a pinch hitter or pinch runner.

Note: Wolfe may have played in 12 games total. Two appearances for the Cubs appear in Retrosheet.org's "Discrepancy File" for Wolfe.

References

Major League Baseball infielders
Chicago Cubs players
Pittsburgh Pirates players
Atlanta Crackers players
Albany Babies players
Jacksonville Tarpons players
Duluth White Sox players
Minneapolis Millers (baseball) players
Louisville Colonels (minor league) players
Baseball players from Cleveland
1880s births
1971 deaths